Robert A. Delagdillo is an American artist whose art celebrates themes in popular culture. Delgadillo draws inspiration from fashion, films and iconic celebrities that he identifies with.

Biography

Early life
Robert A. Delgadillo was born in Los Angeles, California and showed an interest in art from an early age. He states that Hollywood and the animated films of Walt Disney made a major impression on him as a child and inspired him to pursue art as a career.

Education
He spent several years studying the human form taking life drawing courses and attending drawing workshops throughout the Los Angeles area. He is stated as saying that he attributes his greatest academic influence to having studied fashion illustration in the mid 1990s. Delgadillo studied graphic design at the Art Institute of California in Orange County, California and graduated with honors. He pursued his graduate studies in illustration at the Savannah College of Art and Design in Savannah, Georgia where he earned a master's degree.

Early career (2005-2009)
Delgadillo began his art career doing portraits for celebrities including Paris Hilton, Justin Timberlake, Ashton Kutcher and Demi Moore, Nicole Richie, Paz Vega, Ryan Seacrest and Victoria Beckham. During this period he created numerous works of art inspired by popular themes in Pop Culture with emphasis on contemporary and iconic celebrities.

He earned a living as a commercial artist illustrating and art directing a series of successful advertisements for Beverly Hills boutique Kitson that were published in a variety of magazines including Vogue and Vanity Fair. His illustrations for Kitson also appeared on billboards throughout the United States and in point of purchase displays in Nordstroms department stores. The popular advertisements ran in magazines from 2005-2009. In 2006, Delgadillo took on the challenge of branding for Los Angeles based talent agency Sutton, Barth and Vennari.  His illustrated advertisements for the Los Angeles based talent agency would appear at the Golden Trailer and Key Art Awards that same year.

Exhibitions and major projects (2005–present)
His  first solo art exhibition was in 2005 in Beverly Hills, the exhibit featured works of art Delgadillo created inspired by contemporary pop icons including Gwen Stefani and Dita Von Teese, as well as classic Hollywood screen idols such as actress Marilyn Monroe. His work of art entitled Temptation, depicting Brad Pitt and Angelina Jolie as Adam and Eve, earned the artist recognition on an international level including a feature story in In Touch Weekly magazine in (October 24, 2005).

In June 2012 Delgadillo's artworks based on the life of actress Marilyn Monroe were featured in an exhibit at the Hollywood Museum in Hollywood California. Various of his illustrations of Monroe were included during a report televised on the tv show Inside Edition and Hello Hollywood (China).

In February 2013 Delgadillo debuted an art series titled "MOD" at the M Modern Gallery in Palm Springs.  The artwork was inspired by 1960's fashion and pop culture.  Delgadillo gave an extensive interview to the Desert Sun Newspaper.

In June 2013 Delgadillo debuted two art pieces at the Egyptian Theater, Hollywood, commemorating the 75th Anniversary of the film "The Wizard of Oz".  Delgadillo created illustrations of the two witches from the film, Glinda the Good and the Wicked Witch of the West. His artwork based on the film would also be on public exhibition at the Chuck Jones Galleries in both Costa Mesa and San Diego California.

In 2014 Delgadillo collaborated with Chuck Jones Enterprises and Warner Bros. Entertainment creating illustrations featuring cartoon characters from Looney Tunes. His illustration "Say Wabbit" was featured on canvas prints and distributed with retailers including Wayfair, Walmart and All Posters.

The artist created artwork for the Estate of Marilyn Monroe in 2015, illustrating various works inspired by the late actress.

In 2017, two of the artist's illustrations of Tejano singer Selena Quintanilla were featured in Google Arts and Culture as part of the Selena Museum Collection virtual exhibit.

In 2018 Delgadillo collaborated with The Estate of Mahatma Gandhi and The Beanstalk group to create a collection of images based on the likeness of Gandhi for licensing.

Delgadillo designed the 2019 Fiesta De La Flor logo, featuring his illustration of Tejano singer Selena Quintanilla.

Selected group exhibitions
2017: "The Selena Museum Collection"  Google Arts and Culture
2013: "Were Off To See The Wizard- The Wizard of Oz 75th Anniversary Group Art Show"  The Chuck Jones Gallery, Costa Mesa
2013: "The Wizard of Oz 75th Anniversary Group Art Show"  The Chuck Jones Gallery, San Diego
2013: "The Wizard of Oz 75th Anniversary Group Art Show"  Egyptian Theater, Hollywood
2013: "Retro-A-Rama Group Show", M Modern Gallery, Palm Springs
2012: "Marilyn The Exhibit: An Intimate Look At The Legend," The Hollywood Museum, Hollywood
2010: "The Art of Glamour Fashion Show," Rancho Cucamonga Playhouse, Rancho Cucamonga
2005: "Solo Exhibit: POP Life," Beverly Hills

Personal life
Robert A. Delgadillo lives and designs in his hometown of Los Angeles, California.

References

 A full page article was featured on Robert A. Delgadillo in In Touch Weekly magazine in the October 24, 2005 issue.
 Robert A. Delgadillo  has done the illustrations for advertising campaigns for boutique Kitson in Beverly Hills from 2005 to 2007. The ads have appeared in a variety of magazines and on billboards throughout the United States.
 Robert A. Delgadillo  artwork of Gwen Stefani was featured on the cover of Warning magazine in the Summer issue of 2007.
 Robert A. Delgadillo has done illustrations for Los Angeles-based talent agency SBV Talent, including the redesign of their corporate image.
 Robert A. Delgadillo's illustrated ads for SBV Talent have been featured in the programs for the Key Art Awards and Golden Trailer Awards in 2006.
 Robert A. Delgadillo was featured in the Mexican Newspaper La Reforma. The artist was featured on the cover of the newspaper (under the section of Famosos/Famous People) and featured a lengthy interview with RAD along with color photographs of him and his celebrity portraits. May 2007.
Robert A. Delgadillo was interviewed in the August 2011 issue of Inland Empire Magazine.
June 2012 Robert A. Delgadillo's artwork was featured on the television show Inside Edition.
February 14, 2013 Robert A. Delgadillo's interview with the Desert Sun Newspaper.  The article mentions how Robert A. Delgadillo "will bring four prints from his latest, never-before-seen project “Mod Girls.” Known for his celebrity portraits, Delgadillo says this show will be a bit different."
In June 2013 Robert A. Delgadillo (RAD) debuted two art prints at the World Premier Party for the "Wizard of Oz" at the Egyptian Theater in Hollywood, CA.
May 2015 Robert A. Delgadillo gave an extensive interview in the Signal Tribune Newspaper. The article featured color photos of the artist and his artwork in the Culture section.
October 2017 Robert A. Delgadillo's artwork of singer Selena Quintanilla was featured in Google Arts and Culture as part of the Selena Museum Collection.

External links
 

Living people
American artists
Year of birth missing (living people)